Incarnate Word Academy is an all-girls Roman Catholic college preparatory school located in Downtown Houston, Texas, United States.

Incarnate Word Academy serves grades 9 through 12 and is owned and operated by the Congregation of the Incarnate Word and Blessed Sacrament. IWA opened a new $15 million,  academic building in the Spring of 2017 to provide additional space for classes, collaboration, student life, and fine arts.

Student body 
The student body represents fifty-one Catholic parishes and 101 zip codes across the Houston metropolitan area and is a community of 348 young women. As of the 2017–2018 school year, school's racial percentages are as follows:
 Hispanic: 24%
 White American: 48% 
 African-American: 9% 
 Multi-racial: 11%
 Asian/Pacific Islander: 8%

History 
In 1873, Mother Jeanne de Matel and two other sisters of the religious order of the Sisters of the Incarnate Word and Blessed Sacrament arrived at the corner of Jackson and Crawford with a historic mission in mind. The sisters were invited by Bishop John Odin to establish a school for young women.

The sisters arrived in Houston from Lyon, France by way of Brownsville, Texas on April 25, 1873.  They took up their residence in a large building, once a Franciscan Monastery, across the street from St. Vincent's Church on Franklin Street.  A chapel was prepared and on May 5, 1873, Mass was celebrated there.  The student body marks this day each on Foundation Day.

These women of early Texas founded the first permanent school in Houston, and called it Incarnate Word Academy for Young Ladies.

Curriculum 
The curriculum is primarily intended to prepare students for higher education and to this end students take core, college-preparatory courses and electives based on their individual interests.

Advanced Placement program 
The school has an Advanced Placement (AP) program with honors and AP classes, wherein students take classes that closely parallel university-level courses in the same subject. These classes follow a strict syllabus and are graded more rigorously than non-AP courses. They culminate in a standardized, comprehensive exam each spring, a passing score on which may earn the student college credit.

See also
 Christianity in Houston

References

Private high schools in Houston
Roman Catholic secondary schools in Houston
Girls' schools in Texas
Buildings and structures in Houston
Downtown Houston